Viet Hung may refer to several places in Vietnam, including:

Việt Hùng
Việt Hùng, Hanoi, a commune of Đông Anh District
Việt Hùng, Bắc Ninh, a commune of Quế Võ District
Việt Hùng, Nam Định, a commune of Trực Ninh District
Việt Hùng, Thái Bình, a commune of Vũ Thư District

Việt Hưng
Việt Hưng, Hanoi, a ward of Long Biên District
Việt Hưng, Quảng Ninh, a ward of Hạ Long
Việt Hưng, Hải Dương, a commune of Kim Thành District
Việt Hưng, Hưng Yên, a commune of Văn Lâm District